Antonești is a commune in Cantemir District, Moldova. It is composed of two villages, Antonești and Leca.

References

Communes of Cantemir District
Populated places on the Prut